The name Carrier Division 2 or 2nd Carrier Division can refer to:

 Carrier Strike Group 2, US Navy, historically known as Carrier Division 2 until 1965.
 Second Carrier Division, Imperial Japanese Navy